Šilhavý (feminine Šilhavá) is a Czech surname. It may refer to:

 Heidrun Silhavy (born 1956), Austrian politician
 Jaroslav Šilhavý (born 1961), Czech football player and coach
 Josef Šilhavý (born 1946), Czech discus thrower
 Michal Šilhavý (born 1976), Czech footballer
 Thomas J. Silhavy (born 1948), American biologist
 Tomáš Šilhavý (born 1981), Czech footballer
 Zdeňka Šilhavá (born 1954), Czech discus thrower

See also
 

Czech-language surnames